From Sea to Shining Sea is a concept album and 26th album by country singer Johnny Cash, released on Columbia Records in 1968 (see 1968 in music). Each track on the album was written by Cash; none of them were released as singles. The album was included on the Bear Family box set Come Along and Ride This Train.

"The Walls of a Prison" reuses the melody of "Streets of Laredo" from Cash's 1965 album Sings the Ballads of the True West.

Track listing

Personnel

 Johnny Cash – vocals, guitar
 Carl Perkins, Luther Perkins – guitar
 Bob Johnson – guitar, banjo, dobro
 Norman Blake – dobro
 Marshall Grant – bass
 W.S. Holland – drums
 Charlie McCoy – harmonica
 The Carter Family – backing vocals

Additional personnel
Produced by: Don Law
Engineering: Charlie Bragg and Jerry Watson
Cover photo: Bob Cato

References
 The Sky I Scrape entry on From Sea to Shining Sea

External links
 Maninblack.net Great Johnny Cash Fansite

From Sea to Shining Sea
From Sea to Shining Sea
From Sea to Shining Sea
From Sea to Shining Sea